John Mowat may refer to:

 John Mowat (college administrator) (1791–1860), Scottish-born politician and college administrator in Ontario, Canada
 John Mowat (Dean of Brechin), Dean of Brechin, 1947–1953
 John Bower Mowat (1825–1900), Presbyterian minister and university professor in Ontario, Canada
 John McDonald Mowat (1872–1916), lawyer and politician in Ontario, Canada
 John Stuart Mowat (1923–2001), Scottish QC and Liberal politician